Qomshaneh or Qomeshaneh may refer to:
 Qomshaneh, Asadabad
 Qomshaneh, Famenin